Looping Star is a steel roller coaster located at Nagashima Spa Land in Mie, Japan. It is a Looping Star model built by Anton Schwarzkopf in 1982, two years after the park’s Shuttle Loop roller coaster was built.

The trains on Looping Star use a single lap bar to hold riders in the seat. This restraint is effective since the centripetal forces from the loop and helices press riders in their seats, and are a common feature on Schwarzkopf’s looping coasters. However, the ride is known to be considerably shaky and rough. The ride originally opened with four trains, but currently operates with only two. The ride has an orange and white paint scheme with blue trains.

Ride experience
As the train goes up the chain lift hill and into the drop, it goes into a large vertical loop, and then into multiple 180-degree helixes. Then ride goes around a large 180-degree helix and then into a brake run; after two small left turns and a straightaway, the train returns to the station.

Roller coasters introduced in 1982
1982 establishments in Japan
Roller coasters in Japan